Jeong Gi-dong (born 13 May 1961) is a South Korean football goalkeeper who played for South Korea in the 1984 Asian Cup and 1990 FIFA World Cup. He also played for Pohang Steelers and Sangmu FC.

International records

References

External links

 

1961 births
South Korean footballers
South Korea international footballers
Association football goalkeepers
Pohang Steelers players
1990 FIFA World Cup players
Living people